The Animation Showcase is a travelling film screening collection, showcasing animated short films.

Background  

With the support of the private members club Soho House, the showcase started in 2016 with the goal of finding upcoming creative talents in the animation industry and promoting animation in the creative industry. The Animation Showcase hosts a yearly "Best of the Year" screening, highlighting films that become shortlisted and eventual nominees for the Academy Awards Best Animated Short Film category.

The Animation Showcase has been screened in major animation studios, startups, and locations, including Pixar Animation Studios, Laika, Disney Animation Studios, DreamWorks, Google San Francisco, YouTube London  Blur Studio, Cartoon Network, and Soho House (London, New York, Berlin, Shoreditch East London).

The Animation Showcase became available worldwide for members of the film industry via its own streaming platform, which it developed during the COVID-19 pandemic.

Screening format 

The screening lasts around an hour and ends with a question-and-answer session with invited filmmakers. From 2015 until 2018, the screenings were free entrance and/or by invitation.

Screening selections

Best of the year 

Traveling mostly in Europe and the US, the "best of the year" showcase highlights animated short films, months before the official announcement of Academy Awards nominations.

Best of 2016 
(Premiered in September 2016 Soho House Dean Street.)

Inner Workings by Leo Matsudas, (Shortlisted at the 89th Oscars)
 Borrowed Time by Andrew Coats and Lou Hamou-Lhadj, (Nominated at the 89th Oscars)
 Blind Vaysha by Theodore Ushev, (Nominated at the 89th Oscars)
 The Head Vanishes by Frank Dion, (Shortlisted at the 89th Oscars)
Piper by Alan Barillaro, (Academy Award Winner at the 89th Oscars)
 Peripheria by David Coquard-Dassault, (Qualified at the 89th Oscars)
 To Build a Fire by Fx Goby, (Qualified at the 89th Oscars)

Best of 2017 
(Premiered in October 2017 at Soho House Dean Street.)

 Garden Party by Illogic Collective, (Nominated at the 90th Oscars)
 Negative Space by Max Porter and Ru Kuwahata, (Nominated at the 90th Oscars)
 Dear Basketball by Glen Keane and Kobe Bryant, (Academy Award Winner at the 90th Oscars)
 Lou by Dave Mullins and Dana Murray, (Nominated at the 90th Oscars)
 In a Heartbeat by Esteban Bravo and Beth David, (Shortlisted at the 90th Oscars)
 Wednesday With Goddard by Nicolas Menard, (Qualified at the 90th Oscars)
 The Burden by Niki Lindroth von Bahr, (Qualified  at the 90th Oscars)

Best of 2018 
(Premiered in October 2018 at Blue Sky Studios USA.)

 Bilby by Pierre Perifel, Liron Topaz, and JP Sans (Shortlisted at the 91st Oscars)
 Late Afternoon by Louise Bagnall (Nominated at the 91st Oscars)
 Weekends by Trevor Jimenez (Nominated at the 91st Oscars)
 Bao by Domee Shi (Academy Award Winner at the 91st Oscars)
 Grandpa Walrus by Lucrèce Andreae (Shortlisted at the 91st Oscars)
 La Noria by Carlos Baena (Qualified at the 91st Oscars)
 One Small Step by Andrew Chesworth and Bobby Pontillas (Nominated at the 91st Oscars)
 Hybrids by Florian Brauch, Kim Tailhades, Yohan Thireau, Matthieu Pujol, and Romain Thirion (Qualified at the 91st Oscars)

Best of 2019 
(Premiered in October 2019 at Blue Sky Studios USA.)

 Maestro by Bloom Pictures (Qualified at the 92nd Oscars)
 My Moon by Eusong Lee (Qualified at the 92nd Oscars)
The Ostrich Politic by Mohammad Houhou (Qualified at the 92nd Oscars)
 Mémorable by Bruno Collet (Nominated at the 92nd Oscars)
Kitbull by Rosana Sullivan (Nominated at the 92nd Oscars)
 Coaster by Amos Sussigan (Qualified at the 92nd Oscars)
 Hair Love by Matthew A. Cherry (Academy Award Winner at the 92nd Oscars)
 Les Mans 1955 by Quentin Baillieux (Qualified at the 92nd Oscars)
 Uncle Thomas by Regina Pessoa (Shortlisted at the 92nd Oscars)
 Hors Piste by Oscar Malet, Léo Brunel, Camille Jalabert, and Loris Cavalier  (Shortlisted at the 92nd Oscars)
Sister by Siqi Song (Nominated at the 92nd Oscars)

Best of 2020 
(Premiered in November 2020 at Aardman Animations Studios UK. via The Animation Showcase Streaming Platform)

Kapaemahu by Joe Wilson, Dean Hamer, and Hinaleimoana Wong-Kalu (Shortlisted at the 93rd Oscars)
 The Snail and the Whale by Max Lang & Daniel Snaddon (Shortlisted at the 93rd Oscars)
Wild Love by Corentin Yvergniaux, Quentin Camus, Paul Autric, Léa Georges, Maryka Laudet, and Zoé Sottiaux (Qualified at the 93rd Oscars)
 My Life in Versailles by Clémence Madeleine-Perdrillat and Nathaniel H'limi (Qualified at the 93rd Oscars)
Opera by Erick Oh (Nominated at the 93rd Oscars)
Float by Bobby Rubio (Qualified at the 93rd Oscars)
 KKUM by Kim Kang-min (Qualified at the 93rd Oscars)
 If Anything Happens I Love You by Will McCormack & Michael Govier (Academy Award Winner at the 93rd Oscars)
Genius Loci by Adrien Mérigeau (Nominated at the 93rd Oscars)
 Just a Guy by Shoko Hara (Qualified at the 93rd Oscars)
 Yes People by Gísli Darri Halldórsson (Nominated at the 93rd Oscars)
Burrow by Madeline Sharafian (Nominated at the 93rd Oscars)
Something to Remember by Niki Lindroth von Bahr (Qualified at the 93rd Oscars)

Best of 2021 
(Premiered in November 2021 at Netflix via The Animation Showcase Streaming Platform)

Affairs of the Art by Joanna Quinn & Les Mils (Nominated at the 94th Oscars)
Souvenir Souvenir by Bastien Dubois (Shortlisted at the 94th Oscars)
Robin Robin by Dan Ojari & Mikey Please (Nominated at the 94th Oscars)
 The Windshield Wiper by Alberto Mielgo & Leo Sanchez (Academy Award Winner at the 94th Oscars)
 Bestia by Hugo Covarrubias (Nominated at the 94th Oscars)
 Namoo by Erick Oh (Shortlisted at the 94th Oscars)
Mum is Pouring Rain by Hugo de Faucompret (Shortlisted at the 94th Oscars)
Louis' Shoes by MoPA School (2021 Student Academy Award Winner & Qualified at the 94th Oscars)
The Boob Fairy by Léahn Vivier Chapas (Qualified at the 94th Oscars)

Themed programs 

The Animation Showcase screenings started as a series of themed selections, premiered every three months at Soho House and Shoreditch House

 The promising Generation Y - (Premiered in August 2016 at Soho Works)
 What the F#ck - (Premiered in 2016 at Soho Works)
 Art in Motion - (Premiered in 2017 at Shoreditch House)
 Love at First Sight - (Premiered in 2017 at Shoreditch House)
 Our Animal Friends - (Premiered in 2018 at Shoreditch House)
 The French Touch in Music Video  - (Premiered in 2018 at The Animation Workshop)
 Best French shorts successes - (Premiered in 2018 at The Animation Workshop)

Best of Annecy Festival 

Present every year at the Annecy International Animated Film Festival, the founder of The Animation Showcase gathers a selection of the best animated shorts discovered at the Festival for industry members who may have missed the first screenings. The program starts with a selection of upcoming talent for the talent scouts, and finishes with a selection of the "must see" shorts to not miss by the established animation filmmakers.

 The Animation Showcase - Best Of Annecy 2014 - (Premiered at Nexus Productions)
 The Animation Showcase - Best Of Annecy 2015 - (Premiered at Nexus Productions)
 The Animation Showcase - Best Of Annecy 2016 - (Premiered at Picasso Pictures)
 The Animation Showcase - Best Of Annecy 2017 - (Premiered at Nexus Productions)
 The Animation Showcase - Best Of Annecy 2018 - (Premiered at Picasso Pictures)

See also 
International Tournee of Animation
Independent animation
Submissions for Best Animated Short Academy Award

References

External links
 

Animation film festivals
Subscription video on demand services
Film websites